Peter Frank Vettergren (born 3 March 1968) is a Swedish former footballer who started his professional career with Åtvidabergs FF. He is the current assistant manager of the Sweden national team.

Coaching career
Peter started his career coaching the local team of Ödeshög before he joined the first professional club Motala AIF in 1999, where in the very season the club was promoted from Division 4 to Division 3 league championship in his first full season with the club. He was then picked by the Allsvenskan club IF Elfsborg which plays in the Swedish top division football as assistant manager with Magnus Haglund, where he guided the team to win championship in 2006 Allsvenskan and qualify for first time to participate in the UEFA Champions League.

On 3 November 2011 after Magnus Haglund was asked to quit, the club director Stefan Andreasson confirmed that Peter will have a new key role for the club´s future  and then in October 2013 IF Elfsborg offered Peter the role of the main manager at the club which he refused to accept. Peter will be playing the role of an assistant manager for the Swedish national football team though he is officially designated as scout at the present as confirmed by the Swedish national football team current manager Erik Hamrén

Honours

Club
IF Elfsborg as Assistant Manager
 Allsvenskan: 2006
Swedish Champions:
 Winners (2): 2006 and 2012
Runners-up (1): 2008

Cups 
Svenska Cupen:
Winners (1): 2013–2014
Svenska Supercupen:
Winners (1): 2007

European 
 UEFA Intertoto Cup:
 Winners (1): 2008 (joint winner)

Individual

References

External links
 Profile at Svenskafans.com

1968 births
Living people
People from Ödeshög Municipality
IF Elfsborg non-playing staff
F.C. Copenhagen non-playing staff
Swedish footballers
Åtvidabergs FF players
Swedish football managers
Association football midfielders
Footballers from Östergötland County